Love,too Death, too is the twenty-sixth single by the Japanese Pop-rock band Porno Graffitti It was released on October 8, 2008.

Track listing

References

2008 singles
Porno Graffitti songs
SME Records singles
2008 songs
Billboard Japan Hot 100 number-one singles